The 1963–64 snooker season was the series of professional snooker tournaments played between July 1963 and June 1964. The following table outlines the results for the season's events.


Calendar

Notes

References

1963
1963 in snooker
1964 in snooker